Sergey Krasovskiy (born 1975) is a Ukrainian freelance paleoartist best known for his artistic reconstructions of dinosaurs. He was awarded the Society of Vertebrate Paleontology's John J. Lanzendorf PaleoArt Prize in 2017.

References

1975 births
Living people
Paleoartists